This is a list of living British royal family members who, through royal descent or marriage, currently hold the rank of Prince or Princess of the United Kingdom of Great Britain and Northern Ireland. There are 18 living princes and princesses by birthright, and a further 6 individuals who are princesses by marriage.

By descent

By marriage
When a British prince marries, his wife also becomes a British princess; however, she is addressed by the feminine version of the husband's senior title on his behalf, either a princely title or a peerage. Traditionally, all wives of male members of the British royal family, the aristocracy, and members of the public take the style and title of their husbands. An example of this case is Princess Michael of Kent, the wife of the King's first cousin once removed, Prince Michael of Kent.

There is also the case when a princess of blood royal marries a British prince. She also becomes a princess by marriage and will be addressed in the same way. An example of this situation was the late Princess Alexandra, Duchess of Fife: when she married the cousin of her mother, Prince Arthur of Connaught, she became Princess Arthur of Connaught, Duchess of Fife.

If a British prince has a peerage, then the princess is addressed by the feminine version of her husband's peer title; an example of this case is the wife of Prince William, who was (briefly) officially styled His Royal Highness The Duke of Cornwall and Cambridge while his wife Catherine became Her Royal Highness The Duchess of Cornwall and Cambridge, omitting both the 'prince' and 'princess' titles and their first names. When William was then created Prince of Wales, that became the senior title held in his own right, and he and Catherine are styled His/Her Royal Highness The Prince/Princess of Wales.

See also

House of Windsor
List of British monarchs
List of peerages created for British princes
Family tree of the British royal family
Prince of Waterloo

Notes

Sources

British monarchy
 
 
current British princes and princesses
current British princes and princesses
British princes and princesses